Charles Harary (born July 1977) is an American investor, strategic adviser and professor who has gained fame as a motivational speaker, radio show host, and television personality. He is an Orthodox Jew.

Education
Harary attended Yeshiva in Yeshivat Hakotel in the Old City of Jerusalem under the tutelage of Rabbi Bina. 

Harary received his bachelor's degree in political science and communications from Queens College, graduating magna cum laude.  He then attended Columbia Law School, where he was a James Kent Scholar and a Harlan Fiske Stone Scholar.

Career
Harary is the Senior Director of Capital Markets at RXR Realty, a real estate company based in New York. 
Prior to that, Harary co-founded H3 & Company, a venture capital and advisory firm based in New York.
Prior to H3 Capital, Harary was a vice president at RXR Realty. 
Prior to that, he worked as an associate at Paul, Weiss, Rifkind, Wharton & Garrison and Davis Polk & Wardwell.

Harary gives speeches on topics of personal growth, business strategy and productivity. He hosts a weekly podcast entitled The Charlie Harary Show on TheBlaze Radio Network. Prior to airing on TheBlaze Radio Network, The Charlie Harary Show aired Saturday nights on WABC. Harary also hosts  The Boardroom, a weekly business-centered radio show on the Nachum Segal Network. He also hosts a podcast entitled, Unlocking Greatness where he interviews successful entrepreneurs, thought leaders, change agents, influencers and experts, intending to understand how they achieved their success.

In May 2015, Harary launched #TheAskCharlieShow, a video based question-and-answer show where he answers questions submitted by the audience pertaining to issues of personal growth and productivity found in the business setting. He has contributed to several publications, including: Inc., Entrepreneur, Forbes, U.S. News & World Report, Monster.com, All Business Experts, Tech Republic, Daily News, and The Intelligencer.

Harary is a Clinical Professor of Management and Entrepreneurship and an Associate Entrepreneur in Residence at the Syms School of Business at Yeshiva University.

References

American real estate businesspeople
Columbia Law School alumni
Queens College, City University of New York alumni
American motivational speakers
20th-century American Jews
Living people
1977 births
Davis Polk & Wardwell lawyers
Paul, Weiss, Rifkind, Wharton & Garrison people
21st-century American Jews